Jill Craybas was the defending champion, but lost in quarterfinals to Arantxa Parra Santonja.

Maria Sharapova won the title by defeating Anikó Kapros 2–6, 6–2, 7–6(7–5) in the final.

Seeds
The first two seeds received a bye into the second round.

Draw

Finals

Top half

Bottom half

References
 Official Results Archive (ITF)
 Official Results Archive (WTA)

Singles